Steffi Graf was the defending champion and won in the final 6–2, 6–4 against Conchita Martínez.

Seeds
A champion seed is indicated in bold text while text in italics indicates the round in which that seed was eliminated. The top nine seeds received a bye to the second round.

  Steffi Graf (champion)
  Conchita Martínez (final)
  Anke Huber (semifinals)
  Brenda Schultz (semifinals)
  Sabine Hack (second round)
 n/a
  Irina Spîrlea (second round)
 n/a
  Nathalie Tauziat (third round)
  Marianne Werdel (second round)
  Gigi Fernández (second round)
  Barbara Rittner (quarterfinals)
  Angélica Gavaldón (third round)
 n/a
  Shi-Ting Wang (first round)
  Florencia Labat (quarterfinals)

Draw

Finals

Top half

Section 1

Section 2

Bottom half

Section 3

Section 4

External links
 1995 Delray Beach Winter Championships draw

Virginia Slims of Florida
1995 WTA Tour